A lookahead carry unit (LCU) is a logical unit in digital circuit design used to decrease calculation time in adder units and used in conjunction with carry look-ahead adders (CLAs).

4-bit adder
A single 4-bit CLA is shown below:

16-bit adder
By combining four 4-bit CLAs, a 16-bit adder can be created but additional logic is needed in the form of an LCU.

The LCU accepts the group propagate and group generate from each of the four CLAs.  and  have the following expressions for each CLA adder:

The LCU then generates the carry input for each CLA.

Substituting  into , then  into , then  into  yields the expanded equations:

In addition, the LCU can calculate its own propagate and generate:

64-bit adder
By combining 4 CLAs and an LCU together creates a 16-bit adder.
Four of these units can be combined to form a 64-bit adder.
An additional (second-level) LCU is needed that accepts the propagate and generate from each LCU and the four carry outputs generated by the second-level LCU are fed into the first-level LCUs.

References

 
 

Digital circuits
Adders (electronics)

de:Paralleladdierer mit Übertragsvorausberechnung